The Attack of the Dead Men, or the Battle of Osowiec Fortress was a battle of World War I that took place at Osowiec Fortress (now northeastern Poland), on August 6, 1915. The incident got its name from the bloodied, zombie-like appearance of the Russian combatants after they were bombarded with a mixture of poison gases, chlorine and bromine, by the Germans.

Battle
The Germans launched a full-frontal offensive on Osowiec Fortress at the beginning of July; the attack included 14 battalions of infantry, one battalion of sappers, 24–30 heavy siege guns, and 30 batteries of artillery equipped with poison gases led by Field Marshal Paul von Hindenburg. Russian defenses were manned by 500 soldiers of the 226th Zemlyansky Infantry Regiment, and 400 militia.

The 11th Landwehr Division under the command of Infantry General Rudolph von Freudenberg was singled out for the new general attack. The 18th Regiment was deployed in the main direction along the highway and railway. The 76th Landwehr Regiment was to attack the south. To aid the success of the operation on the front of both regiments, it was decided to use a massive gas-balloon attack with chlorine. Other parts of the division to the north and northeast were to support the attack with demonstrative action.

At dawn, at 4:00 a.m. on August 6, 1915, with a tailwind on the entire front of the attack, chlorine was released from 30 gas-balloon batteries. It is estimated that the gas eventually penetrated to a total depth of 20 km, maintaining the striking effect to a depth of 12 km and up to 12 meters in height.

In the absence of any effective means of protection for the defenders, the result of the gas attack was devastating: the 9th, 10th and 11th companies of the Zemlyansky Regiment were completely out of action, from the 12th company in the central redoubt in the ranks remained about 40 people; Byalogrond had about 60 people from three companies. Almost all the first and second lines of defence of the Sosna position were left without defenders. Following the gas release, German artillery opened fire on the fortress and barraged fire for their units moving in the attack. The fortress's artillery was initially unable to fire effectively, as it in turn was hit by a gas wave. This was compounded by the simultaneous shelling of the fortress by both conventional shells and chloropicrin shells. More than 1,600 people were killed in the fortress, and the entire garrison was poisoned with varying degrees of severity.

Over twelve battalions of the 11th Landwehr Division, making up more than 7000 men, advanced after the bombardment expecting little resistance. They were met at the first defense line by a counter-charge made up of the surviving soldiers of the 13th Company of the 226th Infantry Regiment. The Germans became panicked by the appearance of the Russians, who were coughing up blood and bits of their own lungs, as the hydrochloric acid formed by the mix of the chlorine gas and the moisture in their lungs had begun to dissolve their flesh. The Germans retreated, running so fast they were caught up in their own concertina wire traps. The five remaining Russian guns subsequently opened fire on the fleeing Germans.

Suppressing the solitary resistance, the units of the 18th Regiment quickly overcame the first and second line of barbed wire, occupied the tactically important fortified point "Leonov's court" and began to advance along the railway line to the Rudsky Bridge. The only reserve in the Position of Sosna remained a company of militias with up to 50% of the personnel poisoned; the demoralized remnants of the company could not carry out an effective counterattack.

To the south, the 76th Landwehr Regiment quickly occupied the depopulated Sosna, but had proceeded too swiftly and fell under its own gases, suffered significant losses, and was temporarily stopped by the fire of the remnants of the 12th Company at the central redoubt.

There was a real threat of the Germans seizing the Rudsky Bridge, which would mean dissecting the entire defence west of the fortress and the loss of the Sosna position. In this situation, the commandant of the fortress Lieutenant General N.A. Brzozovsky ordered artillery fire on the already occupied areas of the enemy Sosna position and a bayonet counterattack using "all that is possible." The remnants of the 8th and 13th company (about half of the original composition) counterattacked, along with the 14th company which sallied from the fortress.

The 13th company under the command of Lieutenant Kotlinsky counterattacked parts of the 18th regiment along the railway and forced them into flight. During the attack, Lieutenant Kotlinsky was mortally wounded and handed over command of the compound to the 2nd Osovetska Sap Company V. M. Strzeminsky, who, despite severe gas poisoning, with the remnants of the company entrusted to him, carried the attack to the end, using bayonet tactics to take possession of the 1st and 2nd sections of the Sosnya position. Kotlinsky died later that evening.

The Russians did not hold the area for much longer. The Germans threatened to encircle the fortress with the capture of Kaunas and Novogeorgievsk. The Russians demolished much of the fortress and withdrew on August 18.

Legacy

Russian metal band Aria released a song inspired by the battle, titled "Атака Мертвецов" ("Attack of the Dead"), on their 2014 album Через все времена (Through All Times).

Swedish metal band Sabaton released a song about the battle, titled "The Attack of the Dead Men", on their 2019 album The Great War.

See also 
 Angels of Mons

References

Battles of the Eastern Front (World War I)
Military operations of World War I involving chemical weapons